You Can No Longer Remain Silent (German: Du darfst nicht länger schweigen) is a 1955 West German romantic drama film directed by Robert A. Stemmle and starring Heidemarie Hatheyer, Wilhelm Borchert and Werner Hinz. It is based on the 1929 novel  Morning of Life by Kristmann Gudmundsson. It is set amongst feuding Scandinavian fishing families.

It was shot at the Tempelhof Studios in Berlin with location shooting around in Sweden around Gothenburg. The film's sets were designed by the art directors Helmut Nentwig and Karl Weber.

Cast

References

Bibliography 
 Bock, Hans-Michael & Bergfelder, Tim. The Concise CineGraph. Encyclopedia of German Cinema. Berghahn Books, 2009.

External links 
 

1955 films
1955 romantic drama films
German romantic drama films
West German films
1950s German-language films
Films directed by Robert A. Stemmle
Films based on Icelandic novels
Films set in Iceland
German black-and-white films
1950s German films
Films shot in Sweden
Films shot at Tempelhof Studios